Design Miami/ is an American design company that holds two annual flagship collectible design fairs in Miami, Florida and Basel, Switzerland. Design Miami/ also holds fairs in Paris and Shanghai. The fairs feature selling-exhibitions as well as speaker panels, gallery presentations, awards, and unique design commissions. 

Design Miami/ fairs attract designers, gallerists, museum curators, critics, celebrities and collectors from all over the world, with Design Miami/’s 17th Miami Beach edition seeing over 31,000 visitors and featuring over 40 international exhibitors. 

Alongside the fairs Design Miami/ operates an ecommerce platform that facilitates the promotion and sale of historic and contemporary design works in addition to major brand collaborations and product launches. The Design Miami/ website is also host to Forum Magazine, a digital design-centric editorial publication.

Design Miami/ was founded in 2005 by entrepreneur, real estate developer, and art and design collector Craig Robins. In 2000, Robins began working to transform the previously-abandoned Miami Design District into a center for innovative design, architecture, fashion, food and art. By 2005 the renewal of the Miami Design District inspired the creation of the Design Miami/ company and annual fair, shortly followed by Design Miami/ Basel, an annual design fair in Basel, Switzerland managed by Design Miami/. In 2015 Jen Roberts joined Design Miami/ as CEO and has since broadened the company’s initiatives to include an expanded digital presence, a new event concept called Podium aimed at international touring capabilities, and the inaugural Design Miami/ Paris fair set to take place October 2023.

References

External links 
 CNN Style article
 Architectural Digest article
DESIGN MIAMI/ 2022

Design events
Events in Miami
Events in Basel